Daniel J. Gallagher (August 31, 1873 – March 23, 1953) was an American attorney and political figure who served as a delegate to the Massachusetts Constitutional Convention of 1917-1918, the United States Attorney for the District of Massachusetts from 1920 to 1921, and a delegate to 1932 Democratic National Convention from Massachusetts.

His son, Owen A. Gallagher, was a member of the Massachusetts General Court.

References

1873 births
Lawyers from Boston
Massachusetts Democrats
United States Attorneys for the District of Massachusetts
1953 deaths